Alenia Aermacchi was a company active in the aeronautics sector, with offices and plants in Venegono Superiore, Varese, Turin Airport in San Maurizio Canavese, Province of Turin and Pomigliano d'Arco, Province of Naples. From 1 January 2016, the activities of Alenia Aermacchi merged into Leonardo’s Aircraft and Aerostructures Division.

History
Alenia Aermacchi was created on 1 January 2012 as the merger of Alenia Aeronautica and its subsidiaries (Alenia) Aermacchi and Alenia SIA. The former Alenia Aeronautica was created in 1990 by concentrating the Finmeccanica aerospace and defense industries Aeritalia and Selenia.

Products  
 Alenia C-27J Spartan
 Alenia Aermacchi M-345
 Alenia Aermacchi M-346 Master
 Alenia Aeronautica Sky-X
 Alenia Aeronautica Sky-Y

Joint ventures
 ATR 42 with Airbus
 ATR 72 with Airbus
 F-35 Lightning II with Lockheed Martin Aeronautics  
 Eurofighter with Airbus Defence and Space and BAE Systems
 Panavia Tornado with EADS and BAE Systems
 Sukhoi Superjet 100 with Sukhoi
 Boeing 787

See also

 Selex ES
 Thales Alenia Space, ex-Alenia Spazio and ex-Alcatel Alenia Space

References

External links

 
Sito web Eurofighter
Sito web ATR
Sito web SuperJet International

 
Italian brands
Italian companies established in 2012
Leonardo S.p.A.
Companies based in Campania
Multinational aircraft manufacturers